Vaniyakarambai is a village in the Kumbakonam taluk of Thanjavur district, Tamil Nadu, India.

Demographics 

As per the 2001 census, Vaniyakarambai had a total population of 157 with 84 males and 73 females. The sex ratio was 869. The literacy rate was 89.05%.

References 

 

Villages in Thanjavur district